Fraser Ministry may refer to:

 First Lyons Ministry
 Second Lyons Ministry
 Third Lyons Ministry
 Fourth Lyons Ministry